Gymnopilus marginatus is a species of mushroom in the family Hymenogastraceae.

See also

List of Gymnopilus species

External links
Gymnopilus marginatus at Index Fungorum

marginatus
Fungi of North America